Cyprianus (Greek: Κυπριανός) served as Ecumenical Patriarch of Constantinople twice, in 1707-1709 and 1713–1714.

He served as metropolitan bishop of Kayseri. On 25 October 1707, he was elected Patriarch, succeeding Neophytus V.

He gave emphasis to the strictness of clerics' lives and preserved up to today, is his circular about clergy being forbidden to use bright clothing («»). He made, though, enemies and was led to his deposition in May 1709. Later, he was exiled to Vatopedi Monastery of Mount Athos.

In November 1713, when Cyril IV of Constantinople refused the increase to the tax to Sublime Porte and resigned, Cyprianus was reelected Patriarch. Neither he, though, was able to pay the tax of 25,000 Kuruş and he resigned again on 28 February 1714.

Sources 
 Οικουμενικό Πατριαρχείο

18th-century Greek people
18th-century Ecumenical Patriarchs of Constantinople